Francisco Ximénez de Urrea (January 28, 1589 – January 6, 1647) was a Spanish historian and writer.

1589 births
1647 deaths